There have been two baronetcies created for persons with the surname Houldsworth, both in the Baronetage of the United Kingdom. One creation is extant as of 2007.

The Houldsworth Baronetcy, of Reddish, in the Parish of Manchester, in the County Palatine of Lancaster and of Coodham, in the Parish of Symington, in the County of Ayr, was created in the Baronetage of the United Kingdom on 20 July 1887 for the mill-owner and Conservative politician William Houldsworth. The family surname is pronounced "Hoaldsworth".

The Houldsworth Baronetcy, of Heckmondwike in the West Riding of the County of York, was created in the Baronetage of the United Kingdom on 25 January 1956 for the coal industry manager and industrialist Hubert Houldsworth. The title became extinct on the death of his son, the second Baronet, in 1990.

Houldsworth baronets, of Reddish and Coodham (1887)
Sir William Henry Houldsworth, 1st Baronet (1834–1917)
Sir Henry Hamilton Houldsworth, 2nd Baronet (1867–1947)
Sir William Thomas Reginald Houldsworth, 3rd Baronet (1874–1960)
Sir Reginald Douglas Henry Houldsworth, 4th Baronet (1903–1989)
Sir Richard Thomas Reginald Houldsworth, 5th Baronet (born 1947)
The Heir Apparent to the Baronetcy is Simon Richard Henry Houldsworth (born 1971), eldest son of the 5th Baronet.

Houldsworth baronets, of Heckmondwike (1956)
Sir Hubert Stanley Houldsworth, 1st Baronet (1889–1956)
Sir (Harold) Basil Houldsworth, 2nd Baronet (1922–1990)

References

Kidd, Charles, Williamson, David (editors). Debrett's Peerage and Baronetage (1990 edition). New York: St Martin's Press, 1990.

Baronetcies in the Baronetage of the United Kingdom
Extinct baronetcies in the Baronetage of the United Kingdom